Deokjeong Station is a station in Seoul Subway Line 1. On October 15, 1911, the service started. In 2006, it started to operate the metropolitan train.

Platforms
 Platform 1: to Hoegi (Rapid Line)
 Platform 2: to Uijeongbu / Cheongnyangni / Seoul Station / Guro / Incheon
 Platform 3: to Soyosan / Dongducheon
 Platform 4: to Dongducheon (Rapid Line)

Exits
 Exit 1: Deogjeong Elementary School(덕정초등학교, deog-jeong-cho-deung-hag-gyo, Deokjeong Post Office(덕정 우체국, deog-jeong-oo-che-goog), Deokjeong Middle School(덕정 중학교, deog-jeong-joong-hag-gyo), Deokjeong Protection Center(덕정 보호센타, deog-jeong-bo-ho-sen-ta), Hoecheon 1-dong Community Center(회천 1동 커뮤니티 센타, hoe-cheon-il-dong keo-myu-ni-ti-sen-ta), Deokjeong Sarang Church(덕정 사랑교회, deog-jeong-sa-rang-gyo-hwe)

References 

Seoul Metropolitan Subway stations
Railway stations opened in 1912
Metro stations in Yangju
1912 establishments in Korea